A Go Go is the fourth album of J-ska band Potshot. The album was released in the United States by Asian Man Records in 2002.

Tracks
 Potshot Go   2:23
 Not Alone   2:35
 Right and Chance   2:41
 She Is Cute   1:44
 MU330   1:57
 Good Times and Bad Times [Single Version]   2:55
 No Fear   2:37
 End of the Long Summer [Analog Version]   :50
 Hard to Remain   2:23
 Smile   2:24
 Make a Change   2:17
 Go Forward   1:40
 For You   3:17
 New Tomorrow   2:58
 To That Light    2:33
 No Action   2:32
 Bonus Track      1:31

2002 albums
Asian Man Records albums
Potshot (band) albums